Robert Menendez (born January 1, 1954) is an American lawyer and politician serving as the senior United States senator from New Jersey, a seat he has held since 2006. A member of the Democratic Party, he was first appointed to the U.S. Senate by Governor Jon Corzine, and chaired the United States Senate Committee on Foreign Relations from 2013 to 2015, and again since 2021.

In 1974, at the age of 20, Menendez was elected to the Union City School District's Board of Education. He received degrees from Saint Peter's University and Rutgers Law School. In 1986, he was elected mayor of Union City. In 1988, while continuing to serve as mayor, he was elected to represent the state's 33rd district in the New Jersey General Assembly and, within three years, moved to the New Jersey Senate, upon winning the March 1991 special election for the 33rd Senate district. The next year, Menendez won a seat in the House of Representatives and represented New Jersey's 13th congressional district for six two-year terms, from 1993 to 2006. In January 2006, he was appointed to fill the U.S. Senate seat being vacated by Jon Corzine (who had been elected governor of New Jersey), and was elected to a full six-year term in November; he was reelected in 2012 and 2018.

In 2015, Menendez was indicted on federal corruption charges; the jury was unable to reach a verdict and charges were dropped in 2018. The United States Senate Select Committee on Ethics "severely admonished" him.

Early life
Menendez was born on January 1, 1954, in New York City to Cuban immigrants who had left Cuba a few months earlier, in 1953. His father, Mario Menéndez, was a carpenter, and his mother, Evangelina, was a seamstress. The family subsequently moved to New Jersey, where he grew up in an apartment in Union City. He attended Union Hill High School, where his speech teacher, Gail Harper, helped him develop as a public speaker. Menendez has said, "My mother and Miss Harper made me understand the power of education, what it means to put a premium on learning and working hard." While at Union Hill, Menendez became the student body president. He went on to become the first in his family to go to college, attending Saint Peter's College in Jersey City, where he became a member of the Lambda Theta Phi fraternity. He graduated with a B.A. in political science, and earned his Juris Doctor degree from Rutgers Law School in 1979 at the Newark campus. Menendez was admitted to the New Jersey Bar in 1980 and became a lawyer in private practice.

Early political career
At the start of his career, Menendez was an aide to Union City Mayor William V. Musto. In 1974, he was elected to the Union City Board of Education, the youngest candidate to ever win election to the board. In 1982, he unsuccessfully challenged Musto for mayor. On May 13, 1986, he defeated Musto for mayor. Menendez's Alliance Civic Association ticket, which included future mayor Bruce Walter, won 57% of the vote, beating the reform slate Transformation '86 and the incumbent Union City Together ticket. Musto had been found guilty of corruption, and Menendez had testified against him, but Musto retained some popularity. The Together party, which included his wife, Commissioner Rhyta Musto, represented the remnants of Musto's political machine. Menendez served as mayor until 1992 and in November 1987 was elected to represent the state's 33rd district in General Assembly. He continued to hold both offices until March 1991, when he moved from the Assembly to the New Jersey Senate upon winning the special election called following the death of Christopher Jackman.

U.S. House of Representatives (1993–2006)

Elections
In 1992, incumbent Democratic U.S. Congressman Frank Guarini, of New Jersey's 14th congressional district, retired after redistricting. The district had been renumbered as the 13th district, and reconfigured as a Latino-majority district. Menendez decided to run in the primary—the real contest in this heavily Democratic district—and defeated Robert Haney Jr., 68%–32%. He defeated New Jersey Superior Court Judge Fred J. Theemling Jr. in the general election with 64% of the vote. After that, he was reelected every two years with at least 71% of the vote until he was appointed to the U.S. Senate in January 2006.

Tenure
Menendez, who is described as very close to Republicans on foreign policy, voted for the failed Kosovo Resolution, authorizing the use of military force against Yugoslavia in the Kosovo War. He was an early advocate of preventing Iran from obtaining nuclear capabilities, sponsoring the Iran Nuclear Proliferation Prevention Act of 1998, which passed the House but failed to pass the Senate.

Menendez voted for Authorization for Use of Military Force Against Terrorists, authorizing the President to use military force in Afghanistan in response to the 9/11 Terrorist Attacks. In 2002, Menendez voted against the Iraq Resolution to authorize the invasion of Iraq.

Menendez voted against the United Nations Reform Act of 2005, cutting U.S. funding to the U.N. by 50% over three years, and sponsored the Tsunami Orphans and Unaccompanied Children Act of 2005 to provide assistance to victims of the 2004 Indian Ocean earthquake and tsunami.

Menendez voted for the PATRIOT Act in 2001, and in 2006 for its reauthorization.

In the 105th Congress, Menendez voted for the Gramm-Leach-Bliley Act, repealing provisions of the Glass-Steagall Act of 1933 that limited investment banks from acquiring insurance companies or other commercial banks, and voted for the Commodity Futures Modernization Act of 2000. After the 2001 Enron scandal, Menendez voted with 333 other House members for the Sarbanes–Oxley Act.

Although he had sometimes been portrayed as the political boss of Hudson County, he strongly dislikes this appellation, particularly because, according to an anonymous close source quoted in the December 11, 2005 Union City Reporter, "there is no boss of Hudson County". According to a 2005 New York Times op-ed, "Since entering politics as a corruption-fighting mayor of Union City, N.J., Mr. Menendez has become a proponent of business as usual. He has long been an entrenched de facto leader of the Hudson County Democratic machine."

In September 2006, just a few weeks before the 2006 senate elections, the office of the US District Attorney, Chris Christie, began investigating the rental deal with NHCAC, subpoenaing records from them. Some Democrats criticized the investigation, particularly the timing of the investigation and news leaks, as politically motivated.

U.S. Senate (2006–present)
In January 2006, Governor Jon Corzine appointed Menendez to fill the remaining year in Corzine's Senate term from which Corzine resigned upon being elected governor of New Jersey the previous month. While several other people had been mentioned, Menendez was the early favorite among pundits for Governor-elect Corzine's choice. Corzine's decision to appoint Menendez got the support of several Latino groups, including the National Association of Latino Elected and Appointed Officials. Menendez was the sixth Latino to serve in the United States Senate.

In 2015, Menendez was ranked #1 on The Hudson Reporter's annual Power List of the "Fifty Most Powerful Political Figures in Hudson County".

Elections

1996 

When incumbent U.S. Senator Bill Bradley decided to retire in August 1995, Menendez made known his intention to run in the 1996 election for the seat, but eventually dropped out of the race and endorsed Robert Torricelli, the Democrat representing New Jersey's 9th congressional district. Similarly, in 1999, when the state's other U.S. Senator, Frank Lautenberg, announced his planned retirement, Menendez again decided not to run, with the Democratic nomination for the 2000 race going to Goldman Sachs CEO Jon Corzine, who won the general election.

2006 

In the midterm elections held on November 7, near the end of his one-year appointment, Menendez ran to retain his Senate seat. He defeated Republican Thomas Kean Jr., incumbent minority whip in the New Jersey Senate and son of former state governor Thomas Kean, with 53% of the vote to Kean's 45%.

Menendez was endorsed by several newspapers including The New York Times, The Philadelphia Inquirer, The Star-Ledger, and The Record.

2012 

Menendez ran for reelection to a second full term and defeated Republican Joe Kyrillos on November 6, with 58% of the vote to Kyrillos's 39%.

2018 

Menendez ran for reelection to a third full term and defeated Republican Bob Hugin on November 6, with 54% of the vote to Hugin's 42%.

Committee assignments
As of July 2019, Menendez serves on the United States Senate Committee on Banking, Housing, and Urban Affairs; the United States Senate Committee on Finance; and the United States Senate Committee on Foreign Relations.

 Committee on Banking, Housing, and Urban Affairs

 Committee on Finance

 Committee on Foreign Relations (Chair)

Caucus memberships
 Armenian Caucus
 Congressional Autism Caucus
 International Conservation Caucus
 Human Rights Caucus
 Narcotics Abuse and Control Caucus
 Friends of the Irish National Caucus
Afterschool Caucuses
Congressional Hispanic Caucus

Tenure

On January 6, 2021, Menendez was participating in the certification of the 2021 United States Electoral College vote count when Trump supporters attacked the U.S. Capitol. He was evacuated to an undisclosed location, with other senators, after rioters breached the Capitol. He called the attack "anarchy" and "a sad day for our democracy." After the Capitol was secure and Congress reconvened, Menendez voted to certify the election. Menendez blamed Trump and Republicans who supported Trump's baseless claims of voter fraud for inciting the attack. He also called for an investigation into white supremacy in the military.

Immigration
Menendez is an "aggressive advocate" of immigration reform, calling it the "civil rights issue of our time". He has introduced multiple pieces of legislation in attempts to overhaul what he calls our "failed immigration system." Menendez introduced the Comprehensive Immigration Reform Act of 2011, but it died in the Senate Judiciary Committee. In 2009, he introduced the Orphans, Widows, and Widowers Protection Act, granting a pathway to citizenship for the undocumented widowers and orphans of deceased U.S. citizens.

Menendez is a strong supporter of the DREAM Act, saying, "Children should not be punished for the actions of their parents. These kids have grown up as Americans, worked hard in school and now they want to serve our country in the military or pursue a college education. This is the only home many of them have known and they should be encouraged to pursue the American dream." He voted for the DREAM Act in 2007 and was a cosponsor along with 31 other senators in the Act's failed passage in 2010.

Menendez voted against denying legal status to illegal immigrants convicted of domestic violence, crimes against children and crimes relating to the illegal purchase or sale of firearms, but voted to establish a six-month to 20-year ban for undocumented immigrants seeking citizenship who had been convicted for the same crimes along with obstruction of justice, human trafficking and the participation of criminal gang activity.

Menendez supported the Comprehensive Immigration Reform Act of 2006 and Comprehensive Immigration Reform Act of 2007, voting for both bills. He voted against Senate Amendment 1151, declaring English the national language of the Federal government of the United States. He voted to continue federal funding for declared "sanctuary cities."

On January 28, 2013, Menendez was a member of a bipartisan group of eight senators that announced principles for comprehensive immigration reform (CIR). In 2014 the National Council of La Raza (America's largest Latino advocacy organization) recognized Menendez for his work in supporting immigration reform as a member of the "Gang of Eight."

Agriculture 
In June 2019, Menendez and 18 other Democratic senators sent USDA Inspector General Phyllis K. Fong a letter requesting that she investigate USDA instances of retaliation and political decision-making and asserted that not conducting an investigation would mean these "actions could be perceived as a part of this administration's broader pattern of not only discounting the value of federal employees, but suppressing, undermining, discounting, and wholesale ignoring scientific data produced by their own qualified scientists."

Disaster relief 
In April 2018, Menendez was one of five Democratic senators to sign a letter to FEMA administrator Brock Long calling on FEMA to enter an agreement with the United States Department of Housing and Urban Development that would "stand up the Disaster Housing Assistance Program and address the medium- and longer-term housing needs" of evacuees of Puerto Rico in the aftermath of Hurricane Maria. The senators asserted that "FEMA's refusal to use the tools at its disposal, including DHAP, to help these survivors is puzzling – and profoundly troubling" and that hundreds of hurricane survivors were susceptible to being left homeless in the event that FEMA and HUD continued to not work together.

Environment
Menendez introduced legislation that would give incentives for the conversion of vehicles to run on natural gas; the bill did not make it out of committee in its first incarnation, and failed to receive 60 votes required to pass in 2012.

In February 2019, in response to reports of the EPA intending to decide against setting drinking water limits for perfluorooctane sulfonic acid (PFOS) and perfluorooctanoic acid (PFOA) as part of an upcoming national strategy to manage the aforementioned class of chemicals, Menendez was one of 20 senators to sign a letter to Acting EPA Administrator Andrew R. Wheeler calling on the agency "to develop enforceable federal drinking water standards for PFOA and PFOS, as well as institute immediate actions to protect the public from contamination from additional per- and polyfluoroalkyl substances (PFAS)."

In June 2019, Menendez was one of 44 senators to introduce the International Climate Accountability Act, legislation that would prevent President Trump from using funds in an attempt to withdraw from the Paris Agreement and directing the Trump administration to instead develop a strategic plan for the United States that would allow it to meet its commitment under the Paris Agreement.

Education
Menendez sponsored the Student Non-Discrimination Act, expanding Title IX of the Education Amendments Act to LGBT students, and the Safe Schools Improvement Act of 2011, which would also amend the Higher Education Act of 1965. He voted for the Matthew Shepard and James Byrd Jr. Hate Crimes Prevention Act in 2009, saying, "When someone is harassed, assaulted or killed simply because of the type of person they are, it's a crime against an entire community and our nation's values." In 2012, Menendez received a 94% rating from the Human Rights Campaign.

During a press conference about the Teachers and First Responders Back to Work Act, Menendez claimed that New Jersey was facing a $10.5 billion shortfall in its 2012 fiscal budget that would lead to cuts in state spending on education. Politifact rated this statement "false" because the 2012 budget was in fact balanced and increased funding for education.

LGBT policy
Menendez voted for the Defense of Marriage Act (DOMA) as a congressman in 1996; on December 18, 2011, he came out in support of, and co-sponsored, the Respect for Marriage Act, which would repeal DOMA. Menendez also voted for the U.S. military's Don't ask, don't tell as a congressman, and co-sponsored the DADT repeal act in 2010.

In 1999, Menendez voted against a proposed amendment that would have banned adoption in Washington D.C. by same-sex couples and other persons not related by blood or marriage. The amendment failed with 213 votes in favor and 215 votes against.

Of gay rights, Menendez has said, "Two people who want to be committed to each other should be able to enter into marriage, and they should receive the benefits that flow from that commitment."

Gun policy

Menendez has an "F" rating from the National Rifle Association and a "F−" rating from the Gun Owners of America due to his support of gun law reform. Specifically, he supports universal background checks and a ban on assault weapons.

In January 2019, Menendez was one of 40 senators to introduce the Background Check Expansion Act, a bill that would require background checks for either the sale or transfer of all firearms including all unlicensed sellers. Exceptions to the bill's background check requirement included transfers between members of law enforcement, loaning firearms for either hunting or sporting events on a temporary basis, providing firearms as gifts to members of one's immediate family, firearms transferred as part of an inheritance, or giving a firearm to another person temporarily for immediate self-defense.

In June 2019, Menendez was one of four senators to cosponsor the Help Empower Americans to Respond (HEAR) Act, legislation that would ban suppressors being imported, sold, made, sent elsewhere or possessed and grant a silencer buyback program as well as include certain exceptions for current and former law enforcement personnel and others. The bill was intended to respond to the Virginia Beach shooting, where the perpetrator used a .45-caliber handgun with multiple extended magazines and a suppressor.

Health care 
In December 2018, Menendez was one of 42 senators to sign a letter to Trump administration officials Alex Azar, Seema Verma, and Steve Mnuchin arguing that the administration was improperly using Section 1332 of the Affordable Care Act to authorize states to "increase health care costs for millions of consumers while weakening protections for individuals with pre-existing conditions." The senators requested the administration withdraw the policy and "re-engage with stakeholders, states, and Congress."

In January 2019, during the 2018–2019 United States federal government shutdown, Menendez was one of 34 senators to sign a letter to Commissioner of Food and Drugs Scott Gottlieb recognizing the efforts of the FDA to address the effect of the government shutdown on the public health and employees while remaining alarmed "that the continued shutdown will result in increasingly harmful effects on the agency's employees and the safety and security of the nation's food and medical products."

Foreign affairs

Menendez holds that the success of America's foreign policy is "inextricably linked to the health of her domestic democracy", stating in the January 19, 2021, confirmation hearings of Secretary-designate Antony Blinken that public servants and senators have a "duty to stand up for democracy, for the constitution, and for the rule of law." He identified chief concerns as "rebuilding alliances, restoring American leadership in international institutions, and addressing complex global challenges like climate change, migration, pandemics like COVID-19." He identifies the "core American values" as "democracy, human rights, and the rule of law", upon which foreign policy should be recentered.

In February 2006, Menendez cosponsored legislation with Senator Hillary Clinton to make it illegal for foreign governments to buy U.S. port operations. The legislation was a direct response to Dubai Ports World's efforts to purchase Peninsular and Oriental Steam Navigation Company (P&O) of the United Kingdom, which operates six major U.S. ports. Menendez said, "Our ports are the front lines of the war on terrorism. They are both vulnerable targets for attack and venues for smuggling and human trafficking. We wouldn't turn the Border Patrol or the Customs Service over to a foreign government, and we can't afford to turn our ports over to one either."

On April 25, 2008, a former undercover FBI agent revealed in the book Ruse: Undercover with FBI Counterintelligence that Cuban diplomats approached freelance blogger and journalist Robert Eringer to investigate Menendez. It was suggested that the Cuban government was determined to generate derogatory information about him and Representatives Ileana Ros-Lehtinen and Lincoln Díaz-Balart because of their anti-Castro lobbying efforts.

In October 2009, Menendez sent a strongly worded letter of protest to Cyprus President Dimitris Christofias, castigating him for his praise of Cuba's totalitarian system. Christofias, the leader of AKEL, Cyprus's communist party, from 1988 to 2009 and president from 2008 to 2013, had paid a state visit to Cuba in September 2009 for the opening of Cyprus's new embassy and, in his speech, made a number of anti-American embargo references, and spoke of the "common struggle of Cyprus and Cuba". In his letter to Christofias, Menendez wrote, "you cannot claim human rights violations by Turkey in your country and then ignore such violations in Cuba. Second, you cannot call for property rights for Greek Cypriots and then deny them on Cuba. Finally, you cannot take issue with the militarization of northern Cyprus and then ignore the state security apparatus that oppresses the Cuban people."

In December 2010, Menendez voted for the ratification of New Start, a nuclear arms reduction treaty between the U.S. and the Russian Federation obliging both countries to have no more than 1,550 strategic warheads or 700 launchers deployed during the next seven years along with providing a continuation of on-site inspections that halted when START I expired the previous year. It was the first arms treaty with Russia in eight years.

On August 18, 2015, Menendez announced his opposition to the nuclear deal with Iran, saying, "President Obama continues to erroneously say that this agreement permanently stops Iran from having a nuclear bomb, Let's be clear: What the agreement does is to recommit Iran not to pursue a nuclear bomb, a promise they have already violated in the past."

In March 2017, Menendez co-sponsored the Israel Anti-Boycott Act (S.270), which made it a federal crime, punishable by a maximum sentence of 20 years imprisonment, for Americans to encourage or participate in boycotts against Israel and Israeli settlements in the occupied Palestinian territories if protesting actions by the Israeli government.

In 2018, Menendez urged Vice President Mike Pence to enter talks with Ecuador about withdrawing its asylum for Julian Assange. His letter, signed by nine other senators, alleged that it was Assange's goal to "undermine democratic processes globally". In March 2018, Menendez voted against Bernie Sanders's and Chris Murphy's resolution that would end U.S. support for the Saudi Arabian-led intervention in Yemen. But Menendez criticized Saudi Arabia's war in Yemen, saying, "The Saudi Coalition bears significant responsibility for the magnitude of human suffering and scale of destruction in Yemen. Seventy-five percent of the population is in need of humanitarian assistance and more than 8 million are on the brink of famine." Noting concerns with the language after voting for Bob Corker's resolution naming the Saudi crown prince "responsible" for the murder of Jamal Khashoggi, he said, "regardless of all of my other concerns about language is the central essence of what the chairman is going to do. I think it's incredibly important for the Senate to speak on that issue and hopefully speak with one voice."

Menendez condemned the genocide of the Rohingya Muslim minority in Myanmar and called for a stronger response to the crisis.

Menendez raised the issue of Xinjiang reeducation camps and called China's treatment of Uyghur Muslim minority "beyond abhorrent", adding, "The President needs to have a clear and consistent approach to China, and not turn a blind eye as a million Muslims are unjustly imprisoned and forced into labor camps by an autocratic regime."

In January 2019, Menendez opposed Trump's planned withdrawal of U.S. troops from Syria and Afghanistan as a threat to U.S. national security.

In April 2019, Menendez was one of 34 senators to sign a letter to Trump encouraging him "to listen to members of your own Administration and reverse a decision that will damage our national security and aggravate conditions inside Central America", asserting that Trump had "consistently expressed a flawed understanding of U.S. foreign assistance" since becoming president and that he was "personally undermining efforts to promote U.S. national security and economic prosperity" by preventing the use of Fiscal Year 2018 national security funding. The senators argued that foreign assistance to Central American countries created less migration to the U.S. by helping to improve conditions in those countries.

In June 2019, Menendez called for the immediate release of Ukrainian journalist Stanislav Aseyev, who was being held in custody by militants from the so-called Donetsk People's Republic.

In October 2019, Menendez stated his opposition to the Turkish invasion of the Kurdish areas in Syria.

Menendez called for the Trump administration to immediately suspend U.S. military aid to Azerbaijan, sent through Pentagon's "building partner assistance program." According to critics, the aid could be used in the Nagorno-Karabakh conflict between Azerbaijan and Armenia. In September 2020, Menendez tweeted: "I strongly condemn Azerbaijan's attack on Nagorno Karabakh, yet another act of aggression supported by Turkey." He co-signed a letter stating: "We have been very critical of U.S. security assistance to Azerbaijan given the country's human rights record and aggression in the region. Earlier this year, at Senator Menendez's request, the Government Accountability Office agreed to conduct a review of security assistance to the country to ensure that it aligns with U.S. interests; this violence indicates that it does not."

In September 2022, during a Senate Foreign Relations Committee hearing, Menendez criticized the Biden administration for hesitating to impose sanctions on the governments of Sudan and Ethiopia, where many atrocities and war crimes were committed in the Tigray War.

Senate Foreign Relations Committee
Menendez became chair of the Foreign Relations Committee after John Kerry's confirmation as Secretary of State in January 2013. His "Syria force resolution" was praised by President Obama and others. Menendez has supported taking a "hard line" on Iran.

Foreign affairs legislation sponsored
Organization of American States Revitalization and Reform Act of 2013 (S. 793; 113th Congress) – Menendez introduced this bill on April 24, 2013. The bill would require the Secretary of State to develop a multiyear strategy to bolster the Organization of American States (OAS) and improve the OAS's processes for managing its budget and personnel. The act would require the Secretary to provide quarterly briefings to Congress on the progress of implementing that strategy.
Support for United States-Republic of Korea Civil Nuclear Cooperation Act – Menendez introduced this bill, which would authorize the President to extend the term of the "Agreement for Cooperation between the Government of the United States of America and the Government of the Republic of Korea Concerning Civil Uses of Atomic Energy" to a date no later than March 19, 2016. The bill passed the Senate on January 27, 2014, and the House on January 28, 2014.

Ukraine Freedom Support Act of 2014 was introduced to the 113th Congress on September 16, 2014, to address pro-Russian unrest in Ukraine. President Obama signed the bill into law on December 18, 2014.
Defending Ukraine Sovereignty Act of 2022. In light of the prelude to the 2022 Russian invasion of Ukraine, this legislation gave Ukraine $500 million "to assist the country in meeting its defense needs". The bill also reimposes sanctions on Russia.

Other issues
On September 28, 2006, Menendez voted for the Military Commissions Act.

On June 12, 2007, Menendez endorsed Hillary Clinton for president and was given the position of National Campaign Co-Chair. He made numerous media appearances in support of her campaign.

In 2009, Menendez succeeded Senator Chuck Schumer of New York as chair of the Democratic Senatorial Campaign Committee. Menendez's tenure, which followed two straight election cycles of dramatic Democratic gains, was marked by a more troubled Democratic outlook. Critics of Menendez pointed out the surprising Democratic loss in the 2010 Massachusetts Senate special election that followed the death of Ted Kennedy; Menendez's lower-key, more cautious management style; and problems caused by retirements in Indiana and elsewhere. Others, such as Schumer, defended Menendez's performance, citing the negative political climate.

A group of New Jersey citizens launched an effort to recall Menendez in early 2010. Although Article 1, Paragraph 2(b) of the New Jersey Constitution expressly authorizes such a recall, state officials fought the effort in court. On March 16, 2010, a State Appeals court ruled that the recall petition could proceed. Menendez said he was surprised that a group claiming to be true to the Constitution was trying, in his words, "to undermine it". He appealed the ruling. Legal experts have debated the constitutionality of a state recall of a federal officeholder. On November 18, 2010, the New Jersey Supreme Court found that the New Jersey provision violated the U.S. Constitution.

In 2010, The Wall Street Journal reported that Menendez had written to Federal Reserve Chairman Ben Bernanke, asking him to approve an acquisition that would rescue from the prospect of receivership a New Jersey bank, First Bank Americano, operated by Menendez donors. It was discovered that "eight of 15 directors, including the bank's chairman and vice-chairman, have been contributors to Menendez or his political action committee." Former federal bank regulator William K. Black called the letter "grotesquely inappropriate" and said that "the letter crossed an unofficial line by asking regulators to approve an application instead of simply asking that it be given consideration." An aide to Menendez said that his decision to write the letter was not influenced by political contributions. A highly critical Federal Deposit Insurance Corporation report found that the institution had engaged in unsafe or unsound banking practices, including operating without adequate supervision by its board of directors, an excessive level of delinquent or bad loans, inadequate earnings and insufficient coverage of its assets.

On January 5, 2012, Menendez blocked Judge Patty Shwartz, an Obama administration nominee to a federal judgeship, drawing speculation that the block was placed because of Shwartz's relationship with the head of the public corruption unit for New Jersey's federal prosecutor, who had investigated Menendez during his 2006 campaign. Menendez denied personal motivation for the block. He has long contended that the corruption investigation was politically motivated. The investigation was closed in late 2011 with no charges filed.

On December 12, 2012, it was reported that Menendez's office had an unpaid intern volunteering who had let his visitor visa expire and was a registered sex offender. The Bureau of Immigration and Customs Enforcement had been aware of the man as early as October 2012 but according to the Associated Press, the U.S. Department of Homeland Security (DHS) instructed their agents not to arrest the man until after Election Day. Menendez denied knowing about the allegation of the directive to delay the arrest and only recently learned of the arrest. According to two federal officials who spoke on condition of anonymity because they were not authorized to discuss the case, the intern was arrested in front of his New Jersey home on December 6, 2012.

In May 2014, Menendez received an award for Political Courage at a gala organized by the American Friends of Likud, where he reaffirmed the strong alliance between the U.S. and Israel and said, "several thousands of years of history lead to an undeniable conclusion: the reestablishment of the State of Israel in modern times is a political reality with roots going back to the time of Abraham and Sarah and historical texts and artifacts". He rejected movements to boycott Israel.

In February 2015, The Intercept published an investigative work by Ali Gharib and Eli Clifton, assisted in part by the work of independent researcher Joanne Stocker, indicating that Menendez received at least two donations from the People's Mujahedin of Iran (MEK) before September 2012, when it was listed as a Foreign Terrorist Organization. Menendez became an outspoken advocate of the MEK after it was delisted, taking more than $25,000 between 2013 and 2015.

Menendez spearheaded a nonbinding resolution in July 2018 "warning President Trump not to let the Russian government question diplomats and other officials". The resolution states the United States "should refuse to make available any current or former diplomat, civil servant, political appointee, law enforcement official or member of the Armed Forces of the United States for questioning by the government of Vladimir Putin". It passed 98–0.

In April 2019, Menendez was one of 41 senators to sign a bipartisan letter to the housing subcommittee praising the United States Department of Housing and Urban Development's Section 4 Capacity Building program as authorizing "HUD to partner with national nonprofit community development organizations to provide education, training, and financial support to local community development corporations (CDCs) across the country" and expressing disappointment that Trump's budget "has slated this program for elimination after decades of successful economic and community development." The senators wrote of their hope that the subcommittee would support continued funding for Section 4 in Fiscal Year 2020.

Menendez has pushed for a full tax deduction for state and local taxes (SALT). Most of the benefits of such a policy would benefit the richest taxpayers.

Attempted implication in prostitution scandal
In November 2012, the conservative political news and opinion website Daily Caller published allegations that Menendez had contact with underage prostitutes in the Dominican Republic. The allegations were promoted by Republican Party operatives, who arranged for ABC News and the Daily Caller to interview two women who accused Menendez of patronizing prostitutes. ABC News and other news organizations such as The New York Times and the New York Post declined to publish the allegations, viewing them as unsubstantiated and lacking credibility. One accuser stated that she had been paid to falsely implicate Menendez and had never met him. The Daily Caller said this woman was not interviewed for its story. Menendez's office called the allegations "manufactured" by a "right-wing blog" as a politically motivated smear. On March 18, 2013, Dominican police announced that three women had said they had been paid $300–$425 each to lie about having had sex with Menendez.

Allegations of corruption
On August 27, 2006, two Republican state lawmakers filed an ethics complaint against Menendez, alleging he broke conflict-of-interest rules when he rented property out to a nonprofit agency that receives federal funds. Menendez helped the organization win designation as a Federally Qualified Health Center in 1998. That designation allowed the agency to receive additional federal grants. Menendez allies noted that the organization in question, the North Hudson Community Action Corp., which provides social services and health care to the poor and was founded in 1960, had received federal funding for years before Menendez was in Congress, and receives its funding based on mathematical formulas. Menendez maintains that he rented the property out below market-value because "he was supportive of its work". The total rent collected over nine years was over $300,000.
In 2013, reports surfaced that a federal grand jury in Miami was investigating Menendez's role in advocating for the business interests of Florida ophthalmologist Salomon Melgen, a close friend and major donor. On April 1, 2015, the United States Department of Justice indicted Menendez and Melgen in United States v. Menendez (3d Cir. 2016). The charges against Menendez included bribery, fraud, and making false statements. According to the indictment, Menendez asked top State Department officials to pressure the Dominican Republic's government into enforcing a port-security contract that would benefit Melgen's company while at the same time Melgen was promising to give $60,000 to Menendez's campaign.  Prosecutors also charged that Menendez acted as Melgen's "personal senator", helping obtain visas for several of Melgen's girlfriends. In return, Menendez was accused of accepting a range of perks from Melgen, including trips on Melgen's private jet, three nights at a five-star Paris hotel, a round of golf at a private club in West Palm Beach and access to an exclusive Dominican resort—some of which Menendez allegedly failed to report on financial disclosure forms. Melgen also donated a substantial amount of money to Menendez's political campaigns, and prosecutors claim that $750,000 of those contributions were tied to personal benefits Menendez accepted.

After his indictment, Menendez voluntarily stepped down as ranking member of the Foreign Relations Committee. His trial began on September 6, 2017, before Judge William H. Walls of the United States District Court for the District of New Jersey. On November 16, 2017, Walls declared a mistrial due to the jury's continuing inability to reach a verdict on any of the charges. On January 31, 2018, the Justice Department announced it was dropping all charges against Menendez. The case was strongly shaped by McDonnell v. United States, the 2016 Supreme Court decision to dismiss the corruption conviction of former Virginia Governor Bob McDonnell, which narrowed the legal definition of public corruption and made it harder for prosecutors to prove that a political official engaged in bribery.

In April 2018, the United States Senate Select Committee on Ethics "severely admonished" Menendez in a letter, writing:

Awards and honors
West New York, New Jersey, which borders Menendez's childhood hometown of Union City to the north, renamed Public School No. 3 in his honor; it is now known as Robert Menendez Elementary School. The renaming ceremony was held on December 4, 2013. In 2021, he was awarded the Grand Cross of the Order of Honour by President of Greece Katerina Sakellaropoulou, for "his contribution to the deepening of Greek-US relations and the promotion of peace and cooperation in the wider region." He also received the Grand Cross of the Order of Makarios III from President of Cyprus Nicos Anastasiades for "his contribution to promoting human rights, the rule of law, and democracy."

 
  Grand Cross of the Order of Honour
 Star for Merit and Honour (Ministry of National Defence commendation)
 
  Grand Cross of the Order of Makarios III

Personal life
In 1976, Menendez married Jane Jacobsen, a teacher for the Union City Board of Education and Union City Public Schools. They had two children: Alicia Menendez, an MSNBC television commentator/host, and Rob Menendez, who worked as the Commissioner of the Port Authority of New York and New Jersey and was elected to Congress in the 8th congressional district in 2022 as a Democrat. Menendez and Jane divorced in 2005. In October 2019, Menendez got engaged to Nadine Arslanian, a businesswoman from Bergen County. They married in October 2020.

In 2014, Menendez relocated from Union City to Paramus. In 2018, Menendez moved from Paramus to Harrison.

Electoral history

New Jersey Assembly

State Senate

House

Write-in and minor candidate notes:  In 1992, Donald K. Stoveken as an America First Populist received 682 votes.  In 2000, Alina Lydia Fonteboa received 233 votes and Kari Sachs received 168 votes.  In 2002, a candidate listed only as "Independent (The American Party)" received 34 votes; also, Herbert Shaw's full party name was "Politicians are Crooks – Politicos son Corruptos" (shortened for display purposes above).

Senate

See also

List of Hispanic and Latino Americans in the United States Congress
Trump–Ukraine scandal

References

External links

Senator Robert Menendez official U.S. Senate website
Bob Menendez for Senate

Articles
New Jersey's New Senator, editorial, The New York Times, December 9, 2005
Menendez on the Move, Al Sullivan, Union City Reporter, December 11, 2005

Notable congressional hearings
 Senate Foreign Relations Committee — 1/19/2021 — Antony Blinken confirmation hearing for US Secretary of State

|-

|-

|-

|-

|-

|-

|-

|-

|-

|-

|-

1954 births
21st-century American politicians
American politicians of Cuban descent
American people of Spanish descent
American people of Asturian descent
Chairmen of the Senate Committee on Foreign Relations
Democratic Party members of the United States House of Representatives from New Jersey
Democratic Party United States senators from New Jersey
Hispanic and Latino American mayors in New Jersey
Hispanic and Latino American members of the United States Congress
Living people
Mayors of places in New Jersey
Democratic Party members of the New Jersey General Assembly
New Jersey lawyers
Democratic Party New Jersey state senators
People from Paramus, New Jersey
Politicians from New York City
Politicians from Union City, New Jersey
Rutgers School of Law–Newark alumni
Saint Peter's University alumni
Union Hill High School alumni
Grand Crosses of the Order of Honour (Greece)
Hispanic and Latino American state legislators in New Jersey